Guido Gratton (23 September 1932 – 26 November 1996) was an Italian footballer who played as a midfielder.

Club career
A Friulian from Monfalcone, Guido Gratton played for Fiorentina in the 1950s, together with players such as Julinho, Virgili, and Montuori. During his time at the club, the team won the Serie A championship during the 1955–56 season, followed by 4 consecutive 2nd-place finishes; Fiorentina also reached the 1957 European Cup Final but lost to Real Madrid.

In the 1958–59 season the team established the record for the most goals scored in an 18-team league (95, nearly 3 goals per game). Before his time with the 'Gigliati' he played for Parma, Vicenza and Como. In 1960 he went to play for Napoli and finally Lazio at the age of thirty.

International career
Gratton also played as an offensive midfielder for the Italy national team, where he earned eleven caps between 1953 and 1959, scoring 3 goals, and was on the roster for the 1954 World Cup.

1932 births
1996 deaths
People from Monfalcone
Italian footballers
Association football midfielders
Parma Calcio 1913 players
ACF Fiorentina players
L.R. Vicenza players
S.S.C. Napoli players
Como 1907 players
S.S. Lazio players
Inter Milan players
Serie A players
Serie B players
Italy international footballers
1954 FIFA World Cup players
Footballers from Friuli Venezia Giulia